Mulanabad (also Romanized as Mūlānābād, Moolan Abad, and Mowlānābād; also known as Mulinabad) is a village in Khvor Khvoreh Rural District, Ziviyeh District, Saqqez County, Kurdistan Province, Iran. At the 2006 census, its population was 611, in 124 families. The village is populated by Kurds.

References 

Towns and villages in Saqqez County
Kurdish settlements in Kurdistan Province